The Verdict is a 1964 British mystery thriller film directed by David Eady and starring Cec Linder, Zena Marshall and Nigel Davenport. Part of the Edgar Wallace Mysteries film series made at Merton Park Studios, the film's sets were designed by the art director Peter Mullins.

Cast
 Cec Linder as Joe Armstrong
 Zena Marshall as Carola
 Nigel Davenport as Larry Mason
 Paul Stassino as Danny Thorne
 Derek Francis as Supt. Brett
 John Bryans as Prendergast
 Derek Partridge as Peter
 John Glyn-Jones as Harry 
 David Cargill as 	Johnny
 Derek Aylward as Phillip-Greene
 William Dysart as Det. Sgt. Good
 John Moore as House Detective
 Kenneth Benda as Lord Chief Justice
 William Raynor as Clerk of the Court
 Denis Holmes as Mr. Matthews
 Dorinda Stevens as Molly
 Phyllis Rose as Woman in Night Club
 Sidonie Bond as Reporter
 John Murray Scott as Reporter
 Peter Thomas as 	Reporter
 Allan Warren as Page Boy

References

Bibliography
 Clinton, Franz Anthony. British Thrillers, 1950-1979: 845 Films of Suspense, Mystery, Murder and Espionage. McFarland, 2020.

External links

1964 films
British thriller films
1960s thriller films
Films set in England
Merton Park Studios films
Films directed by David Eady
Edgar Wallace Mysteries
1960s English-language films
1960s British films